Ugashik Bay Airport  is a public use airport located 11 nautical miles (13 mi, 20 km) south-southwest of the central business district of Pilot Point, near Ugashik Bay in the Lake and Peninsula Borough of the U.S. state of Alaska. It is owned by the Bureau of Land Management.

Facilities and aircraft 
Ugashik Bay Airport has one runway designated 12/30 with a gravel surface measuring 5,280 by 125 feet (1,609 x 38 m). For the 12-month period ending December 31, 2005, the airport had 50 aircraft operations, an average of 4 per month, all general aviation.

Airline and destination 
The following airline offers scheduled passenger service:

See also 
 Ugashik Airport (FAA: 9A8, IATA: UGS) - 
 Pilot Point Airport (FAA: PNP, IATA: PIP, ICAO: PAPN) -

References

External links 

 Topographic map from USGS The National Map

Airports in Lake and Peninsula Borough, Alaska
Bureau of Land Management